Bobby socks are a style of women's sock, white, ankle-length or collected at the ankle, instead of at full extension up the leg.

The term bobby soxer derives from this type of sock.

They were initially popular in the United States in the 1940s and 1950s, later making a comeback in the 1980s.

References

1940s fashion
1950s fashion
1960s fashion
Socks